Total Eclipse is an American teen drama web series starring Mackenzie Ziegler, Lauren Orlando, Johnny Orlando, Emily Skinner, Nadia Turner, Devenity Perkins, and Darius Marcell. The series is produced by digital network Brat and premiered on April 5, 2018, on Brat's YouTube channel. It follows a group of high school students and sheds light on common themes among teens such as bullying and relationships, including friendships, cliques, and romances. The protagonist Cassie, played by Ziegler, is cast out of her childhood friend circle and seeks to re-establish those friendships, make new friends, and negotiate social situations at school and in her community.

Synopsis

Season 1
At Millwood High, Cassie is a teenager who was ditched by her childhood friends Diana, Morgan, and Jenna. To cope with their bullying, she dreams of a world where she is an astronaut on the moon, a fantasy that she and her friends had devised as children. Cassie is loyal to her friends even after some of them betray her, like when Diana embarrasses Cassie by publicly revealing copies of Cassie's private drawings.

Cassie initially befriends Kate to win back her former friends but later warms up to her. Their friendship is complicated because of Cassie's reciprocated interest in Kate's brother, Sam. Jenna, whose parents have a difficult marriage, also has a crush on Sam and kisses him, but tells him to keep it a secret. Kate bonds with Luca, a witchcraft-practicing boy at the shop she works, who later develops feelings for her.

Season 2
Diana starts to imagine herself as a princess in her own world. Cassie and Sam briefly grapple with their crushes on each other, to Kate's dismay. Later, Morgan leaves Diana's group, and Kate distances herself from Luca and his witchcraft. Meanwhile, Jenna steals clothing from Perry's stepmother's store. Cassie, witnessing the shoplifting, takes the blame to preserve Jenna’s relationship with her boyfriend. Cassie breaks up with Sam and wants to date Julian, a crush from her dance class before she finds out that Diana has reached Julian first. Jenna's situation at home starts to worsen, and she reveals that she escapes into her own world where she is the superhero.

Season 3

The girls imagine from time to time that they are in their own world. Luca offers to produce a song for Sam. Kate and Sam's ailing aunt, Bonnie, moves in with their family and dies soon after. Cassie tries to help Sam and Kate cope with the death of their aunt, and Sam and Cassie grow closer again. Sam and Kate grieve at home for some time but when they return to school, they learn that Luca has taken credit for Sam's song. Sam confronts Luca who later apologizes to Sam and the two make amends. The history teacher, Ms. Dawson, takes out old frustrations by singling Cassie out, lying, and changing test scores to undermine her academic career. Morgan joins the experimental film club to please her boyfriend Eli, but she quits when he pressures her to choose between the club and her other friends. Ms. Dawson befriends and manipulates Jenna to alienate her from the other girls, and then tries to use her as a weapon against them. Cassie, Diana, and Morgan are suspended, supposedly for cheating in history and skipping Spanish as the vice-principal, Mr. Lane believes Ms. Dawson, who is manipulating him romantically. Cassie and Diana rekindle their friendship through their efforts to reveal Ms. Dawson's unethical behavior. Morgan’s older sister, Jasmine, who was Ms. Dawson's classmate, helps Cassie and Diana discover and reveal Ms. Dawson's real identity and dishonesty. Mr. Lane finally believes the girls and has Ms. Dawson removed. At the end of season 3, Sam and Cassie are seen holding hands and appear to share a kiss. They kiss and realize that they are meant for each other, but Cassie tells Kate that they are not a couple. Cassie, Kate, Diana, Jenna, and Morgan all become friends.

Season 4
There is a new counselor named Mr. James. Magic Moves closes down and there is a new boy at Millwood named Axel. Jenna immediately falls for him, but he seems to be playing games with Jenna and Diana. Sam goes away leaving a note saying he was going to go to the conservatory, but he was not actually accepted. Cassie, Diana, Kate, Morgan, and Jenna get into a fight until Belle stops them when she reveals that she and Axel are dating and Axel had been playing them. Cassie, Diana, Kate, Morgan, and Jenna make a pact to never let a boy ruin their friendship.

Season 5
The girls have plans for the summer. Cassie works in The Parlor during the summer to save up to audition for the dance conservatory while Jenna works at Tres Chic. Kate promotes her eating healthy food video which Morgan helps her film. They help keep Junior’s customers from The Parlor, as the two are rivals, but they all sort it out in the end. This strains Morgan, Kate, and Cassie's friendship, but they make up when Cassie helps Junior's by delivering them fruit. Meanwhile, Diana attends summer school along with Sam, meets a boy named Marley, and learns something about him that makes her think about her past. Additionally, Jenna and Spencer become a couple and Portia, Marley, and Jerry are introduced.

Cast

 Mackenzie Ziegler as Cassandra "Cassie" Gordon
 Lauren Orlando as Kate Parker
 Emily Skinner as Diana
 Nadia Turner as Jenna Waterson
 Devenity Perkins as Morgan
 Johnny Orlando as Sam Parker
 Darius Marcell as Spencer
 Mike Lane as Mr. Lane
 Bryce Xavier as Scott (seasons 2–3)
 Isaak Presley as Axel (seasons 4-5)

Recurring
 Lilia Buckingham as Autumn Miller (seasons 1–3)
 Dominic Kline as Brayden (seasons 1–2)
 Samuel Parker as Eli (seasons 1–4)
 Grant Knoche as Jules (season 1)
 Paityn Hart as Georgia (seasons 1-2)
 Logan Pepper as Luca (seasons 2–3)
 Steffan Argus as Julian (seasons 2–3)
 Heather Woodward as Felicity (seasons 2–3)
 Lisa Maley as Ms. Dawson (season 3)
 Paul Arnold as Junior Chambers (seasons 4-5)
 Lisette Alexis as Belle (season 4)
 Will Simmons as Marley (season 5)
 Sage Rosen as Jerry (season 5)
 Sawyer Fuller as Portia (season 5)
 Michelle Bernard as Randi Roach (season 5)

Episodes

Season 1 (2018)

Season 2 (2018)

Season 3 (2019)

Season 4 (2019)

Season 5 (2020)

Production 
On March 12, 2018, Brat announced the series. Production for season 1 took place in Los Angeles that month. The show premiered on April 5, 2018. A second season of the series premiered on September 6, 2018. The third season of the series premiered on March 21, 2019. Forbes reported that Total Eclipse and another Brat show, Chicken Girls, helped the network accumulate a "loyal audience" of 15 million unique viewers in three months that "the company is beginning to monetize by moving into advertising in 2019".

In 2018, Brat released a special YouTube movie titled Brat Holiday Spectacular co-starring Ziegler as Cassie, Skinner as Diana, and other characters from Total Eclipse, that has been viewed more than 7 million times as of February 1, 2021.

Reception 
Forbes reported that Total Eclipse and Brat's most popular show, Chicken Girls, helped the network accumulate a "loyal audience" of 15 million viewers that "the company is beginning to monetize by moving into advertising in 2019".

References

External links 
 
 Season 1 playlist on Brat's YouTube channel
 Season 2 playlist on Brat's YouTube channel
 Season 3 playlist on Brat's YouTube channel
 Season 4 playlist on Brat's YouTube channel

Brat (digital network)
2018 web series debuts
American teen drama web series
Fantasy comedy web series
2010s YouTube series
2020s YouTube series
YouTube original programming